The 2013 Lakeside World Professional Darts Championship was the 36th World Championship organised by the British Darts Organisation, and the 28th staging at the Lakeside Country Club at Frimley Green. Christian Kist was the defending men's champion, having won the title for the first time in 2012, but was knocked out in the first round against Robbie Green. Scott Waites, the third seed and pre-tournament favourite, won his first world championship by defeating Tony O'Shea 7–1, who became the first man to lose his first three BDO World Championship finals. Anastasia Dobromyslova defended her world title by defeating Lisa Ashton & in doing so, won the world championship for the 3rd time.

Players from around the globe competed to reach the BBC and ESPN televised finals, which ran from 5 to 13 January at Frimley Green.

Format and qualifiers

Men's
The televised stages featured 32 players. The top 16 players in the BDO rankings over the 2011/12 season were seeded for the tournament.

Women's
The televised stages featured 8 players. The top 2 players in the WDF/BDO rankings over the 2011/12 season were seeded for the tournament.

Prize money
The prize money was £258,000 for the men's event and £16,000 for the women's event.

Men's Champion: £100,000
Runner-Up: £30,000
Semi-Finalists (2): £11,000
Quarter-Finalists (4): £6,000
Last 16 (8): £4,250
Last 32 (16): £3,000

Women's Champion: £10,000
Runner-Up: £2,000
Semi-Finalists (2): £1,000
Quarter-Finalists (4): £500

There was also a shared 9 Dart Checkout prize of £52,000, along with a High Checkout prize of £3,000 per event.

Results bracket

Men's
The draw for the tournament was made on 13 October 2012 live on ESPN. Final set of the game must be won by two clear legs, in case of a 5-5 a sudden-death leg is played.

Women's
 All matches best of three sets, best of five legs.
The results are:

TV coverage

BBC Sport
BBC Sport coverage is presented by Colin Murray and Bobby George who will present live coverage and highlights. Rob Walker returns as Darts Extra host and reporter during the live coverage.  Commentary comes from Tony Green, Vassos Alexander and Jim Proudfoot who replaces David Croft who moved to Sky F1 for 2012.

ESPN UK
ESPN coverage is presented by Ray Stubbs who returns to host his 11th Lakeside after previously hosting from 2001 to 2009 on the BBC.  He will host with BDO players; Nat Coombs will be relief host and reporter. Commentary is shared with the BBC and comes from Green, Alexander and Proudfoot.

Both channels coverage comes from IMG Sports Media who provide the equipment, build the set, commentary boxes etc. and supply the output for both broadcasters.

Statistics

Men
{|class="wikitable sortable" style=" text-align: right"
|-
! Player
! Round
! Played
! Sets Won
! Sets Lost
! Legs Won
! Legs Lost
! 100+
! 140+
! 180s
! High Checkout
! Average
|-
|align="left"|  Martin Adams
| First Round
| 1
| 2
| 3
| 10
| 10
| 30
| 13
| 4
| 131
| 83.97
|-
|align="left"|  Martin Atkins
| First Round
| 1
| 1
| 3
| 8
| 11
| 18
| 12
| 2
| 144
| 83.14
|-
|align="left"|  Mark Barilli
| First Round
| 1
| 2
| 3
| 7
| 12
| 21
| 10
| 1
| 108
| 77.50
|-
|align="left"|  Stephen Bunting
| Second Round
| 2
| 5
| 6
| 24
| 22
| 64
| 26
| 11
| 167
| 94.00
|-
|align="left"|  Jason Cullen
| Second Round
| 2
| 3
| 5
| 14
| 20
| 40
| 26
| 5
| 61
| 86.94
|-
|align="left"|  Rohit David
| First Round
| 1
| 1
| 3
| 5
| 11
| 14
| 8
| 0
| 110
| 76.29
|-
|align="left"|  Jeffrey de Graaf
| First Round
| 1
| 2
| 3
| 11
| 14
| 31
| 14
| 3
| 108
| 86.04
|-
|align="left"|  Geert De Vos
| Second Round
| 2
| 4
| 6
| 15
| 21
| 48
| 18
| 5
| 116
| 85.07
|-
|align="left"|  Jan Dekker
| Quarter-finalist
| 3
| 11
| 10
| 49
| 40
| 107
| 40
| 12
| 150
| 85.75
|-
|align="left"|  Steve Douglas
| Second Round
| 2
| 4
| 5
| 15
| 18
| 32
| 15
| 7
| 100
| 80.83
|-
|align="left"|  Tony Eccles
| First Round
| 1
| 2
| 3
| 9
| 9
| 22
| 15
| 1
| 116
| 90.84
|-
|align="left"|  Darryl Fitton
| Quarter-finalist
| 3
| 9
| 9
| 40
| 39
| 93
| 56
| 19
| 116
| 92.64
|-
|align="left"|  Richie George
| Semi-finalist
| 4
| 13
| 14
| 50
| 61
| 150
| 62
| 20
| 129
| 83.09
|-
|align="left"|  Robbie Green
| Quarter-finalist
| 3
| 10
| 7
| 38
| 31
| 81
| 41
| 16
| 120
| 88.99
|-
|align="left"|  Wesley Harms
| Semi-finalist
| 4
| 16
| 12
| 64
| 54
| 180
| 84
| 15
| 161
| 89.88
|-
|align="left"|  Jimmy Hendriks
| Second Round
| 2
| 5
| 6
| 21
| 25
| 42
| 17
| 6
| 128
| 78.00
|-
|align="left"|  Paul Jennings
| Quarter-finalist
| 3
| 9
| 6
| 34
| 30
| 73
| 41
| 13
| 144
| 86.03
|-
|align="left"|  Christian Kist
| First Round
| 1
| 1
| 3
| 6
| 10
| 15
| 10
| 5
| 74
| 85.69
|-
|align="left"|  Scott Mitchell
| Second Round
| 2
| 4
| 6
| 18
| 21
| 53
| 20
| 2
| 130
| 78.88
|-
|align="left"|  Ross Montgomery
| First Round
| 1
| 1
| 3
| 8
| 10
| 28
| 9
| 2
| 103
| 87.21
|-
|align="left"|  Alan Norris
| Second Round
| 2
| 6
| 5
| 23
| 22
| 54
| 27
| 15
| 125
| 83.61
|-
|align="left"|  Tony O'Shea
| Runner-up
| 5
| 19
| 15
| 72
| 65
| 192
| 96
| 30
| 161
| 90.09
|-
|align="left"|  Dave Prins
| First Round
| 1
| 2
| 3
| 12
| 14
| 28
| 15
| 3
| 40
| 81.03
|-
|align="left"|  Gary Robson
| First Round
| 1
| 1
| 3
| 7
| 10
| 17
| 9
| 2
| 100
| 83.54
|-
|align="left"|  Gary Stone
| First Round
| 1
| 1
| 3
| 6
| 11
| 22
| 7
| 4
| 90
| 83.00
|-
|align="left"|  Garry Thompson
| Second Round
| 2
| 6
| 5
| 22
| 24
| 55
| 21
| 10
| 98
| 86.38
|-
|align="left"|  Benito van de Pas
| First Round
| 1
| 2
| 3
| 9
| 12
| 19
| 12
| 5
| 100
| 83.08
|-
|align="left"|  Willy van de Wiel
| First Round
| 1
| 0
| 3
| 4
| 9
| 14
| 7
| 2
| 32
| 80.87
|-
|align="left"|  Scott Waites
| Winner
| 5
| 25
| 5
| 83
| 35
| 162
| 78
| 24
| 156
| 89.56
|-
|align="left"|  John Walton
| First Round
| 1
| 0
| 3
| 5
| 9
| 17
| 10
| 3
| 100
| 88.64
|-
|align="left"|  Wayne Warren
| First Round
| 1
| 1
| 3
| 6
| 10
| 25
| 11
| 3
| 121
| 84.49
|-
|align="left"|  James Wilson
| First Round
| 1
| 2
| 3
| 7
| 12
| 16
| 13
| 2
| 86
| 85.71
|-

Women
{|class="wikitable sortable" style="font-size: 95%; text-align: right"
|-
! Player
! Round
! Played
! Sets Won
! Sets Lost
! Legs Won
! Legs Lost
! 100+
! 140+
! 180s
! High Checkout
! Average
|-
|align="left"|  Irina Armstrong
| Quarter-finalist
| 1
| 1
| 2
| 7
| 8
| 16
| 3
| 2
| 48
| 65.92
|-
|align="left"|  Lisa Ashton
| Runner-Up
| 3
| 5
| 2
| 17
| 10
| 38
| 14
| 1
| 120
| 79.28
|-
|align="left"|  Anastasia Dobromyslova
| Winner
| 3
| 6
| 2
| 21
| 12
| 60
| 12
| 2
| 144
| 80.39
|-
|align="left"|  Lorraine Farlam
| Quarter-finalist
| 1
| 0
| 2
| 2
| 6
| 7
| 6
| 0
| 40
| 71.52
|-
|align="left"|  Julie Gore
| Quarter-finalist
| 1
| 0
| 2
| 4
| 6
| 14
| 3
| 0
| 93
| 65.41
|-
|align="left"|  Trina Gulliver
| Semi-finalist
| 2
| 3
| 3
| 11
| 12
| 21
| 14
| 0
| 120
| 73.02
|-
|align="left"|  Deta Hedman
| Quarter-finalist
| 1
| 0
| 2
| 3
| 6
| 13
| 3
| 0
| 40
| 73.83
|-
|align="left"|  Sharon Prins
| Semi-finalist
| 2
| 2
| 3
| 8
| 13
| 19
| 10
| 1
| 47
| 67.20
|-

References

External links
 The official site of the Lakeside BDO World Professional Darts Championship
 Playing Schedule

BDO World Darts Championships
BDO World Darts Championship
BDO World Darts Championship
BDO World Darts Championships
Sport in Surrey
Frimley Green